Irene Hervey (born Beulah Irene Herwick; July 11, 1909December 20, 1998) was an American film, stage, and television actress who appeared in over fifty films and numerous television series spanning her five-decade career.

A native of Los Angeles, Hervey was trained in her youth by British stage and film actress Emma Dunn, a friend of her mother. She signed a contract with Metro-Goldwyn-Mayer in 1933, appearing in several films for the studioincluding The Stranger's Return (1933), opposite Lionel Barrymorebefore landing a supporting role as Valentine de Villefort in United Artists' The Count of Monte Cristo (1934). She signed a contract with Universal Pictures, appearing in numerous films for the studio, including the Western Destry Rides Again (1939) opposite Jimmy Stewart and Marlene Dietrich, the mystery The House of Fear (1939), and the musical The Boys from Syracuse (1940), the latter of which she appeared opposite her then-husband Allan Jones.

She appeared in films throughout the 1940s into the 1950s, including the horror film Night Monster (1942) opposite Bela Lugosi, the fantasy Mr. Peabody and the Mermaid (1948), and the film noir A Cry in the Night (1956). Beginning in the mid-1950s, Hervey transitioned to television, appearing as a guest star on Perry Mason, Honey West,  and My Three Sons, the latter of which earned her a Primetime Emmy Award nomination for Outstanding Single Performance by an Actress in a Supporting Role. Hervey appeared in occasional minor film roles in her later career, such as Gene Saks's Cactus Flower (1969) and Clint Eastwood's thriller Play Misty for Me (1971).

Hervey died on December 20, 1998, of heart failure in Los Angeles. She had two children, one of whom is pop singer Jack Jones.

Early life
Hervey was born Beulah Irene Herwick on July 11, 1909 in  Venice, Los Angeles, California. Her father was a sign painter, and her mother a Christian Science practitioner whose pupil was English actress Emma Dunn. Dunn agreed to become Hervey's acting coach during her childhood. Hervey attended Venice High School in Venice, Los Angeles, where she appeared in school theater productions.

Career

Early films

She began her acting career after being introduced to a casting agent from Metro-Goldwyn-Mayer (MGM). After a successful screen test, she was signed by the studio and made her screen debut in the 1933 film The Stranger's Return, opposite Lionel Barrymore.

Though signed by MGM, Hervey was loaned by the studio and appeared in several films including United Artists' The Count of Monte Cristo (1934) and With Words and Music, released by Grand National Films Inc. In 1934, she was cast as the murderess Myra in the thriller Rendezvous at Midnight, but was replaced by Irene Ware.

In 1936, Hervey left MGM and signed with Universal Pictures. While at Universal, Hervey appeared in The League of Frightened Men (1937) and Destry Rides Again (1939) with Marlene Dietrich and James Stewart. She also intermittently freelanced at other studios, appearing in such films as Grand National Pictures' The Girl Said No (1937), a musical comedy featuring music by Gilbert and Sullivan.

At Universal from 1940 to 1943, Hervey had the lead in 11 B pictures, one A (The Boys from Syracuse) and one serial (Gang Busters).

In 1943, Hervey was seriously injured in a car accident and was forced to retire from acting for five years.
Though she did briefly return to acting for the stage play No Way Out, where she played Dr. Enid Karley, in 1944.

Later career
Hervey returned to acting in 1948 with the film Mickey, followed by Mr. Peabody and the Mermaid. By the early 1950s, she began appearing in television. Throughout the 1950s and early 1960s, Hervey appeared in several television series, including the crime dramas Richard Diamond, Private Detective, Peter Gunn, and Hawaiian Eye. She also made three guest appearances on Perry Mason: in 1958, she played Helen Bartlett in "The Case of the Black-Eyed Blonde"; in 1961, she played Grace Davies in "The Case of the Jealous Journalist", and in 1963, she played Jill Garson in "The Case of the Lawful Lazarus". She returned to theater with a role opposite Hans Conried in Take Her, She's Mine, a comedy written by Henry and Phoebe Ephron, which had regional performances in Massachusetts and Connecticut in the summer of 1963. A reviewer from a local publication noted that Hervey "registers effectively" in her role. In 1965, she landed a regular role on The Young Marrieds, followed by a stint on the short-lived Anne Francis series Honey West as the titular character's Aunt Meg.

In 1969, Hervey was nominated for an Emmy Award for Outstanding Single Performance by an Actress in a Supporting Role for her appearance on My Three Sons. After her roles as Mrs. Durant in the comedy Cactus Flower and as Madge in the 1971 thriller film Play Misty for Me with Clint Eastwood, Hervey retired from acting. She took a job working at a travel agency in Sherman Oaks, California and briefly returned to acting in 1978 with a role in Charlie's Angels. In 1981, she made her last on-screen appearance in the television movie Goliath Awaits, which centers on a community of survivors from a World War II shipwreck who have survived decades living underwater.

Personal life

As a teenager, Hervey married her first husband William Fenderson in 1929 and had a daughter, Gail; they divorced. In the mid-1930s, she was  engaged to Robert Taylor. In 1936, she met and married actor Allan Jones. The couple had a son, singer Jack Jones, born in 1938. They divorced in 1957.

Hervey died on December 20, 1998 at the age of 89 from heart failure at the Motion Picture & Television Country House and Hospital in Woodland Hills, Los Angeles. She was cremated, and her ashes returned to her surviving daughter.

Honors
For her contribution to the motion picture industry, Hervey has a star on the Hollywood Walk of Fame at 6336 Hollywood Boulevard.

Filmography

Film

Television

Stage credits

Notes

References

Works cited

External links

 
 
 
 Irene Hervey at Virtual History

1909 births
1998 deaths
20th-century American actresses
Metro-Goldwyn-Mayer contract players
American television actresses
American film actresses
American stage actresses
Actresses from Los Angeles
People from Venice, Los Angeles
Venice High School (Los Angeles) alumni